Calocypha is a genus of jewel damselfly in the family Chlorocyphidae. There are at least two described species in Calocypha.

Species
These two species belong to the genus Calocypha:
 Calocypha laidlawi (Fraser, 1924)
 Calocypha petiolata

References

Further reading

 
 
 

Chlorocyphidae
Articles created by Qbugbot